Bendigamos is a hymn sung after meals according to the custom of Spanish and Portuguese Jews. It has also been traditionally sung by the Jews of Turkish descent. It is similar in meaning to the Birkat Hamazon that is said by all theistic Jews. Bendigamos is said in addition to Birkat Hamazon, either immediately before or immediately after it. The text is in modern Spanish, not Ladino. The prayer was translated by David de Sola Pool. Below is the actual text as well as the translation by de Sola Pool.  The melody is one of the best known and loved Spanish and Portuguese melodies, used also for the Song of the Sea (in the Shabbat morning service) and sometimes in "Hallel" (on the first day of the Hebrew month and on festivals).

It is currently sung in New York's Congregation Shearith Israel during the festival of Sukkot, as well as on other occasions and at Shabbat meals at the homes of members. It is sung every Shabbat in the Spanish and Portuguese communities of Great Britain and of Philadelphia, though it was unknown in London before the 1960s. It is also sung by the Jewish communities in the north of Brazil (Manaus and Belem), who brought the melody from Morocco in the 19th century, during the earliest Jewish immigration to the Amazon. The song probably originated among the Spanish-speaking Jews of Bordeaux, where the song is now sung in French using a translation by David Lévi Alvarès. From France the Bendigamos song was probably brought to the Dutch West-Indies (Curaçao) in the mid-nineteenth century and thence taken to New York and Amsterdam. Alternatively, the song may have originated with Sephardic Jews living in Spain, who then immigrated to Turkey, other locales in the Ottoman Empire, and the Netherlands. It may originally have been written as a secret way to say the Grace After Meals (Birkat HaMazon) after practicing Judaism in Spain and Portugal was forbidden in the fifteenth century. 

A final phrase is inserted at the end in Hebrew which is repeated twice:

.הוֹדוּ לַיָי כִּי־טוֹב. כּי לְעוֹלָם חַסְדּוֹ
Give thanks to the Lord, for He is good.  His mercy endures forever.

Alternate text 
There is also an alternate text, which appears to be attributable to Sephardic Jews of the Caribbean islands such as Jamaica and Barbados.  While the pronunciation varies, which may affect the transliteration spelling, the text is the same.

External links
 Bendigamos A Youtube clip song by a Sephardic family in Israel.

Notes

References

Jewish blessings
Spanish and Portuguese Jews
Sephardi Jewish culture in Turkey
Jewish liturgical poems
Spanish-language songs